Eugene Frank Selawski (November 28, 1935 – May 11, 1993) was an American football player. He was a first-team All-American tackle at Purdue University in 1958 and played three years of professional football for the Los Angeles Rams (1959), Cleveland Browns (1960) and San Diego Chargers (1961).

Early years
Selawski was born and raised in Cleveland, and graduated from John Adams High School. He then attended Purdue University where he played college football at the tackle position for the Purdue Boilermakers football team from 1956 to 1958. He was selected by the Football Writers Association of America as a first-team tackle on its 1958 College Football All-America Team.

Career 
Selawski was drafted by the Los Angeles Rams in the ninth round of the 1958 NFL Draft and played for the Rams in 12 games during the 1959 NFL season. In 1960, he returned to Ohio to play in 12 games for his hometown Cleveland Browns. In 1961, he jumped to the American Football League, appearing in eight games for the San Diego Chargers.

Death
Selawski died May 9, 1993, at age 57, in Duluth, Georgia.

References

1935 births
1993 deaths
American football tackles
Oakland Raiders players
Purdue Boilermakers football players
John Adams High School (Ohio) alumni
Players of American football from Cleveland